Ascanio Piccolomini may refer to:
 Ascanio I Piccolomini (died 1597), archbishop of Siena, 1588–1597
 Ascanio II Piccolomini (1590–1671), archbishop of Siena, 1629–1671